Sturle Holseter (born 9 April 1976) is a retired Norwegian ski jumper.

In the World Cup he finished once among the top 3, with a second place from Sapporo in January 1997. He finished among the top 10 a further four times.

He participated in the 1997 World Championships in Trondheim, where he finished fifteenth in the normal hill.

References

1976 births
Living people
Norwegian male ski jumpers
People from Buskerud
Sportspeople from Viken (county)